This is a list of the 78 municipalities in the province and autonomous community of Asturias, Spain, with their areas, populations and the comarca in which each is located.

See also

Geography of Spain
List of Spanish cities

References

Asturias